This is a list of the British Liberal Party, SDP–Liberal Alliance, and Liberal Democrats general election manifestos since the 1900 general election.

From 1900 to 1918, the Liberal general election manifesto was usually published as a form of a short personal address by the leader of the Party. From 1922, the party usually published a more formal document.

From the 1900 election to the 1979 election the party went to the polls as the Liberal Party. In 1983 and 1987, the party went to the polls under the banner of the "Alliance", as a result of the pact between the Liberals and the Social Democratic Party, which formed as a breakaway from Labour in 1981. Since 1992 it has competed as the Liberal Democrats, due to the merger of the Liberals and the SDP in 1988.

From 2010 to 2015, the Liberal Democrats, having signed an agreement with the Conservatives, served as junior partner in the first coalition government since the Second World War.

See also

List of Conservative Party (UK) general election manifestos
List of Labour Party (UK) general election manifestos

Further reading
 Iain Dale, Liberal Party general election manifestos, 1900–1997, Routledge, 2000,

References
Archive of Liberal / SDP / Libdem Manifestos, 1900–2001
Party Manifestos

Manifestos
Political manifestos
United Kingdom politics-related lists
Party platforms
Manifestos